is a Japanese actress who has appeared in a number of feature films, television series and stage plays.

Biography
Sagara was scouted in Takeshita street by Itoh Company during her third year junior high school's summer vacation in 2009.

In 2010 she had started her entertainment activities. Sagara's acting debut was in the drama Atami no Sōsa-kan in July. Later, on December 14 she released the photo album Hajimete no Suki.

Filmography

Films

TV drama

Music programmes

Other TV programmes

Internet

Advertisements

Music videos

Stage

Publications

Photo albums

DVD

Bibliography

References

Notes

External links
  

21st-century Japanese actresses
1995 births
Living people
Actors from Saitama Prefecture